The 1970–71 British Ice Hockey season featured the Northern League for teams from Scotland and the north of England and the newly formed Southern League for teams from the rest of England. 

Murrayfield Racers won the Northern League and Sussex Senators won the Southern League. Murrayfield Racers won the Icy Smith Cup.

Northern League

Regular season

Southern League

Regular season

Spring Cup

Final
Murrayfield Racers defeated the Ayr Bruins

Icy Smith Cup

Final
Murrayfield Racers defeated Durham Wasps 21-8

Autumn Cup

References

British
1970 in English sport
1971 in English sport
1970 in Scottish sport
1971 in Scottish sport